Zsuzsanna Sipos is a Hungarian set decorator. She won an Academy Award in the category Best Production Design for the film Dune.

Selected filmography 
 Dune (2021; co-won with Patrice Vermette)

References

External links 
 

Living people
Place of birth missing (living people)
Year of birth missing (living people)
Set decorators
American set decorators
Hungarian emigrants to the United States
Best Art Direction Academy Award winners